Simplicity is the third album recorded by the English actor/singer Tim Curry, released in 1981.

Whereas his previous album Fearless had been almost entirely original songs, Simplicity is a half-originals, half-covers mix and contains a wider variety of source material than the covers on his first album Read My Lips (1978). Covers include a version of The Zombies' "She's Not There" and Martha and the Vandellas' "Dancing in the Streets", both of which were hits in 1964. Curry also performs a version of "Take Me, I'm Yours", originally a 1978 hit by Squeeze. "Out Of Pawn" was originally by Davis Lasley's band "Rosie", produced by Michael Kamen.

The track "Working on My Tan" was released as a single in certain countries (backed with "On a Roll") but was not commercially successful. Curry did not make any promo videos for the album.

Track listing
 "Working on My Tan" (Tim Curry, Michael Kamen, Bob Babbitt, Charles Collins, Bob Kulick, Michael Tschudin) - 4:05
 "She's Not There" (Rod Argent) - 2:22
 "Simplicity" (Tim Curry, Bob Babbitt, Charles Collins)- 4:13
 "On a Roll" (Tim Curry, Michael Kamen, Joel Newman) - 2:49
 "Take Me, I'm Yours" (Chris Difford, Glenn Tilbrook) - 3:50
 "Dancing in the Streets" (Marvin Gaye, Ivy Hunter, William "Mickey" Stevenson) 3:59
 "Betty Jean" (Tim Curry, Michael Kamen) -  3:20
 "Out of Pawn" (David Lasley, Lana Marrano) - 3:43
 "Summer in the City" (John Sebastian) - 3:05
 "I Put a Spell on You" (Screamin' Jay Hawkins) - 3:32

Personnel
 Tim Curry – vocals
 Earl Slick – guitar
 Hank Crawford – saxophone
 Howard Johnson – saxophone
 David "Fathead" Newman – saxophone
 David Sanborn – saxophone
 Charlie Miller – trumpet
 Art Baron – trombone
 Michael Kamen – keyboards
 Joel Newman – guitar
 Bryant Montiro – guitar
 John Siegler – bass
 Noel Alphonso – drums
 Jimmy Maelen – percussion
 Laurel Massé, Gui Andresano, Ula Andrisano, Ula Hedwig, Seth, Dian Sorel, Sasha – background vocals

Chart positions
 Album

Billboard (USA)

RPM (Canada)

References

Simplicity (Tim Curry album)
Simplicity (Tim Curry album)
A&M Records albums
Albums produced by Michael Kamen